Owdeh (also Romanized as ‘Owdeh and ‘Ūdeh; also known as Uwda) is a village in Gheyzaniyeh Rural District, in the Central District of Ahvaz County, Khuzestan Province, Iran. At the 2006 census, its population was 1,220, in 234 families.

References 

Populated places in Ahvaz County